Qañat or Qeñet (alternatively spelled Kignit, Keniet, Gegnet, Gignit) are secular musical scales developed by the Amhara ethnic group of Ethiopia. Qañat consists in a set of intervals defining the mode of a musical piece or the tuning scale of the instrument playing the piece. There are four main qañat scales that are used, all of which are pentatonic: tizita (ትዝታ), bati (ባቲ), ambassel (ዐምባሰል), and anchihoye (አንቺሆዬ). Three additional modes are variations on the above: tezeta minor, bati major, and bati minor. Some songs take the name of their qañat, such as tizita, a song of reminiscence.

History 

Ashenafi Kebede was one of the early scholars to standardize the kignits of northern and central Ethiopia.

References

Ethiopian music
Pentatonic scales